Hakan Yilmaz is Professor at the Department of Political Science and International Relations, Boğaziçi University, Istanbul.

University education and career
Yilmaz completed his undergraduate education at the Economics Department of Boğaziçi University (1987). He received his MA (1991) and Ph.D. (1996) degrees at the Political Science Department of Columbia University in New York City. He has taught courses and published works in the areas of contemporary Turkish politics, the culture and identity dimensions of European integration and European-Turkish relations, the international context of democratization, and culture and politics. Dr. Yilmaz has run research projects on Euroskepticism in Turkey (2004); conservatism in Turkey (2006); the political and cultural attitudes of the Turkish middle classes (2007); the European public perceptions of Turkey (2009), the processes of othering and discrimination in Turkey (2010). He was awarded by the European Commission a Jean Monnet course in the area of “issues of culture and identity in European integration.

Examples of his recent publications are : Placing Turkey on the Map of Europe (İstanbul: Boğaziçi University Press, 2005); “Islam, Sovereignty, and Democracy: A Turkish View” (Middle East Journal, Vol. 61, No. 3, Summer 2007, pp. 477–493); “Turkish Conservatism and the Idea of Europe” (in Between Europe and the Mediterranean: The Challenges and the Fears, ed. Paul Sant Cassia and Thierry Fabre, New York: Palgrave MacMillan, 2007, pp. 137–161), “Turkish Identity on the Road to the EU: Basic Elements of French and German Oppositional Discourses” (Journal of Southern Europe and the Balkans, Volume 9, Issue 3, 2007, pp. 293–305); “Europeanization and Its Discontents: Turkey, 1959-2007” (in Turkey's Accession to the European Union: An Unusual Candidacy, ed. Constantine Arvanitopoulos, Berlin: Springer-Verlag, 2009, pp. 53–64); “The International Context of Democratization” (in Democratization, ed. Christian W. Haerpfer, Patrick Bernhagen, Ronald Inglehart, and Christian Welzel, Oxford and New York: Oxford University Press, 2009, pp. 92–106).

As far as his interest in arts is concerned, He is writing poetry and song lyrics, he is an active musician, and he was a founder and vocalist of "Ezginin Günlüğü", a top-ranking folk-pop group of Turkey since the early 1980s. He performed in three albums of Ezginin Günlüğü: Sabah Türküsü (The Morning Tune), Alagözlü Yar (the Clear-Eyed Beloved), and Doğu Türküleri (Songs from the East). He is working on a new personal album, which he is planning to release in 2011.

Links
Personal Web Site: http://www.hakanyilmaz.info Personal Blog: http://www.hakan-yilmaz.blogspot.com/ Departmental Web Site: http://www.pols.boun.edu.tr/

Living people
Year of birth missing (living people)
Place of birth missing (living people)
Academic staff of Boğaziçi University
Columbia Graduate School of Arts and Sciences alumni